Pseudathyma falcata, the falcate false sergeant, is a butterfly in the family Nymphalidae. It is found in Guinea, Ivory Coast, Ghana, Togo, and western Nigeria. The habitat consists of forests.

Adult males mud-puddle.

References

Butterflies described in 1969
Pseudathyma